XHTE-FM is a radio station on 99.9 FM in Tehuacán, Puebla, Mexico.

History
XHTE received its concession on February 1, 1980 but signed March 18 a month later also the first FM in Tehuacán. It was owned by Ángel López Meza. Control was consolidated in the López Cárdenas family operating as Digital 99.9 Radiodifusores in 2010.

Long known as Stereo Luz, the station changed names and formats to become Ke Buena in May 2021. This was dropped after 10 months in March 2022.

References

Radio stations in Puebla
Radio stations established in 1980
1980 establishments in Mexico